A. catechu may refer to:
 Acacia catechu, the mimosa catechu, a deciduous thorny tree species
 Areca catechu, the areca palm or areca nut palm, a species of palm species found in much of the tropical Pacific